"Texas Women" is a song written and recorded by American musician Hank Williams Jr.  It was released in February 1981 as the first single from the album Rowdy.  The song was Williams Jr.'s third number one on the country chart, the first since "Eleven Roses" in 1972.  The single went to number one for one week and spent a total of ten weeks on the chart.

Charts

References

1981 singles
1981 songs
Hank Williams Jr. songs
Songs written by Hank Williams Jr.
Song recordings produced by Jimmy Bowen
Elektra Records singles
Curb Records singles
Songs about Texas